The following is a list of episodes for the Canadian television series Mr. Young, which airs on YTV in Canada and Disney XD internationally.

Series overview

Episodes

Season 1 (2011)

Season 2 (2012)

Season 3 (2012–13)

References

External links
 Episode guide at Zap2it
 Episode guide at MSN TV
 Episode guide at TV Guide

Mr. Young
it:Episodi di Professor Young (prima stagione)